Jules George (1903 – April 1983) was a Belgian rower and sports official.

George joined the soccer club RFC Liège in 1915 but it was in rowing that he had better success. He competed at the 1924 Summer Olympics in Paris with the men's coxed four where they were eliminated in the round one repechage. His son, Robert George, won the Double Sculls Challenge Cup at the 1952 Henley Royal Regatta and competed in the 1952 Summer Olympics.

George became the largest scrap metal dealer in Europe after WWII. In 1971, he became the president of RFC Liège and held that role until his death in April 1983. He is buried in the Robermont Cemetery in Liège.

References

1903 births
1983 deaths
Belgian male rowers
Olympic rowers of Belgium
Rowers at the 1924 Summer Olympics
European Rowing Championships medalists
20th-century Belgian people